2,5-Dimethoxy-4-ethylamphetamine (DOET, DOE, Hecate) is a psychedelic drug of the phenethylamine and amphetamine chemical classes. It was first synthesized by Alexander Shulgin, and was described in his book PiHKAL (Phenethylamines i Have Known And Loved).

Chemistry 
DOET is in a class of compounds commonly known as substituted amphetamines; its full chemical name is 4-ethyl-2,5-dimethoxy-alpha-methylbenzeneethanamine, or 1-(2,5-dimethoxy-4-ethylphenyl)propan-2-amine. It has an active stereocenter and (R)-DOET is the more active enantiomer. DOET is an extremely rare compound and reports of its effects and toxicology in humans are sparse.  However, like the more common 2,5-dimethoxy-amphetamine analogues DOB, DOI and DOM, it is a potent and long-acting psychedelic.  Removal of the alpha-methyl moiety yields the 2-carbon analogue, commonly known as 2C-E, another psychedelic compound first synthesized by Dr. Alexander Shulgin.

Pharmacology 
Similarly to related drugs like DOM, DOET likely acts as a 5-HT2A, 5-HT2B, and 5-HT2C receptor partial agonist. It is an agonist of human TAAR1.

Effects 
DOET produces psychedelic effects that last up 14–20 hours. In PiHKAL, Shulgin lists the dosage of DOET as being 2–7 mg orally, with 6–7 mg being the dosage for full, desired effects.

Legal status
Internationally, DOET is a Schedule I controlled drug; under the Convention on Psychotropic Substances, it's legal only for medical uses or scientific research:.

United States
DOET is classified as a Schedule I substance in the United States and is similarly controlled in other parts of the world.

Australia
DOET is considered a Schedule 9 prohibited substance in Australia under the Poisons Standard (October 2015). A Schedule 9 substance is a substance which may be abused or misused, the manufacture, possession, sale or use of which should be prohibited by law except when required for medical or scientific research, or for analytical, teaching or training purposes with approval of Commonwealth and/or State or Territory Health Authorities.

See also 
 2,5-Dimethoxy-4-Substituted Amphetamines

References

External links 
 DOET Entry in PiHKAL
 DOET Entry in PiHKAL • info

Designer drugs
Substituted amphetamines
2,5-Dimethoxyphenethylamines
TAAR1 agonists